The 2020 cycling season for Groupama–FDJ began in January at the Tour Down Under in Australia.

Team roster

Riders who joined the team for the 2020 season

Riders who left the team during or after the 2019 season

Season victories

National, Continental and World champions

Footnotes

References

External links
 
 

2020 road cycling season by team
Groupama–FDJ
2020 in French sport